Forest of Dean by-election may refer to:

 1887 Forest of Dean by-election
 1911 Forest of Dean by-election
 1912 Forest of Dean by-election
 1925 Forest of Dean by-election

Disambiguation pages